Ruston Regional Airport  is a public use airport in Lincoln Parish, Louisiana, United States. It is owned by the City of Ruston and is located three nautical miles (6 km) east of its central business district.

Opening in 1995, the facility also serves the Louisiana Tech University's Department of Professional Aviation. The university maintains a fleet of Cessna and Piper airplanes which account for most of the airport's daily traffic.

Facilities and aircraft 
It has one runway designated 18/36 with an asphalt surface measuring 5,000 by 100 feet (1,524 x 30 m).

For the 12-month period ending April 17, 2009, the airport had 86,000 general aviation aircraft operations, an average of 235 per day. At that time there were 32 aircraft based at this airport: 81% single-engine, 6% multi-engine, 9% jet and 3% helicopter.

References

External links 
 Aerial photo as of 1 January 1998 from USGS The National Map via MSR Maps
 

Airports in Louisiana
Buildings and structures in Lincoln Parish, Louisiana